Albany BWP Highlanders was an American soccer team based in Schenectady, New York, United States. Founded in 2003, the team played in the USL Premier Development League (PDL), the fourth tier of the American Soccer Pyramid, in the Northeast Division of the Eastern Conference. The team spent two years on hiatus from the league in 2008 and 2009, returning to competition in 2010, then folded at the end of the season.

The team played its home games at Frank Bailey Field on the campus of Union College in nearby Schenectady, New York, The team's colors were black, gold, and white.

History
The roots of the Highlanders go back to Steve Freeman's youth in Tampa, Florida where he played for Blackwatch Keelley.  Freeman spent his first season of college playing for Hartwick College and another with Siena College, both in New York, before finishing college in Florida.  After graduation, he returned to New York and settled in Albany where he taught school.  In January 1997, he founded Albany Blackwatch, a youth club modeled on the club he played for as a boy.  The club began with two boys teams, but quickly expanded to several boys and girls teams, each with a Scottish-themed name.  In 2001, Blackwatch entered a team into the USL Super Y-League.  In 2003, Freeman created the Blackwatch Highlanders and entered it into the USL Premier Development League.  Freeman served as the general manager and Bernie Watt coached the team.  The Highlanders played from 2003 until 2007, first as Blackwatch and then as the Albany Admirals, the last season with Freeman as head coach.  They then went on a  two-year hiatus before being resurrected in 2009 as the Albany BWP Highlanders, and re-joined the PDL for the 2010 season.

Notable former players

This list of notable former players comprises players who went on to play professional soccer after playing for the team in the Premier Development League, or those who previously played professionally before joining the team.

  Jhonny Arteaga
  Devlin Barnes
 Anthony McCann 
  Josh Bolton
  Colin Burns
  Scott Cannon
  Daniel Capecci
  Greg Chevalier
  Adrian Dubois
  Jordan James
  Brian Levey
  Ryan Pierce
  Derek Popovich
  Chris Riley
  Dwayne Whylly

Year-by-year

Head coaches
  Bernie Watt (2003)
  Steve Freeman (2007)
  Franz Zwicklbauer (2010)

Stadia
 Frank Bailey Field; Schenectady, New York (2003–2007, 2010)
 CBA Stadium; Albany, New York (2007) 2 games

Average attendance
Attendance stats are calculated by averaging each team's self-reported home attendances from the historical match archive at https://web.archive.org/web/20100105175057/http://www.uslsoccer.com/history/index_E.html.

 2005: 149
 2006: 138
 2007: 130
 2008: Did not play
 2009: Did not play
 2010: 185

References

External links
Official Site
Official PDL site

Sports in Schenectady County, New York
Men's soccer clubs in New York (state)
Defunct Premier Development League teams
Association football clubs established in 2003
Association football clubs disestablished in 2010
2003 establishments in New York (state)
2010 disestablishments in New York (state)
Schenectady, New York